Lockdown is a film about a detective that is framed for a crime he didn't commit and is sent to prison. Directed by Frank Harris, the film starred Richard Lynch, Chris DeRose, Chuck Jeffreys, Elizabeth Kaitan and Joe Estevez.

Story
A detective has been wrongfully framed for a murder of his partner and is then sent to prison for 15 years to life. Inside, it's a battle just to get through each day. In order to prove his innocence he has to effect a plan to escape, and the only way he can prove himself innocent is do it on the outside. He has to confront the gangster that set him up.

Background
The story was written by Joseph Izzo and Joseph Mangelli. The music was provided by Bob Mamet.

It was released on DVD in March 2001.

Cast

Releases

References

External links
 Imdb: Lockdown
 Comeuppance Review: Lockdown

1990 films
1990 action films
American action films
American independent films
Films directed by Frank Harris
1990 independent films
1990s English-language films
1990s American films